Manchán, Mainchín, Manchéne and a variety of other spellings may refer to:

Places
 Manaccan, south Cornwall, England, United Kingdom.

People

Saints
 Ireland
 Mainchín of Limerick (fl. late 6th century), son of Sétna, patron saint of Limerick. Feast day: 29 December.
 Manchán of Lemanaghan (d. 665), son of Sillán, patron of Liath Mancháin, now Lemanaghan, in County Offaly. Feast day: 20 or 24 January.
 Manchán of Min Droichit (d. 652), also Manchéne, scholar and abbot of Min Droichit (Co. Offaly). Feast day: 2 January.
 Mainchín of Corann, son of Collán. Feast day: 13 January.
 Manchán of Mohill, (d. 538), linked to Mohill, co. Leitrim and his Shrine. Feast day: 14 February
 Manchán of Athleague, (fl. 500), patron saint of Athleague, county Roscommon. Invoked against disease.
 Scotland
 St Machan, 12th century Scottish Saint.
 Wales
 Mawgan, Meugan, Meigant, (fl.  5th or 6th century), refers to one or two Brythonic saints of Cornwall/Brittany (Mawgan) and Wales (Meugan).
 Mannacus, 6th century, Caer Gybi (fort) in Wales.

First name
 Manchán Magan, Irish poem writer

fr:Machan de Lemanaghan